Richard Stuart Best, Baron Best, (born 22 June 1945) is a British social housing leader and member of the House of Lords.

Biography
The son of late Walter Best DL and Frances Chignell, Best was educated at Shrewsbury School and the University of Nottingham. He married Ima Akpan in 1970, divorcing in 1976. Best married Belinda Stemp in 1978 and has two daughters and two sons with his two wives.

From 1970 to 1973, Best served as Director of the British Churches Housing Trust, then of the National Federation of Housing Associations 1973–88. From 1988 to December 2006, he led the Joseph Rowntree Foundation and Joseph Rowntree Housing Trust. He has written extensively on housing and chaired commissions on housing for Northern Ireland, Westminster, Birmingham, Glasgow and Hull.

Best is a member of the House of Lords Built Environment Committee, and has previously chaired the House of Lords Audit Committee between 2005 and 2010 and the Select Committee on Communications between 2014 and 2017. Lord Best has previously sat on the EU Homes Affairs Committee and the Economic Affairs Committee. He is also President of the Sustainable Energy Association and Co-Chairs the All Party Parliamentary Group on Housing and Care for Older People. Lord Best served as Chair of the Hanover Housing Association 2006–2015. Best chaired The Property Ombudsman between 2009 and 2017. He was President of the Local Government Association 2007–2016, Commissioner of the Rural Development Commission 1989–98, Trustee and Treasurer of the Royal Society of Arts 2007–14, a member of the NCVO Advisory Council 2008–2016. Lord Best has also chaired the Oxford University Commission on Creating Healthy Cities and the Affordable Housing Commission.

On 4 June 2001, Best was created a life peer as Baron Best, of Godmanstone in the County of Dorset. He sits as an independent crossbencher in the House of Lords.

Honours
He was appointed an Officer of the Order of the British Empire (OBE) in the 1988 New Year Honours.

He has been awarded honorary degrees from the Universities of York and Sheffield. In September 2014, he was elected a Fellow of the Academy of Social Sciences. He is also an Honorary Fellow of the RIBA. He is a Deputy Lieutenant (DL) of North Yorkshire.

References

External links
Lord Best, House of Lords

1945 births
Living people
Crossbench life peers
People's peers
Public housing in the United Kingdom
Alumni of the University of Nottingham
People educated at Shrewsbury School
Officers of the Order of the British Empire
Deputy Lieutenants of North Yorkshire
British charity and campaign group workers
Fellows of the Academy of Social Sciences
Life peers created by Elizabeth II